Friday the 13th: A New Beginning (also known as Friday the 13th Part V: A New Beginning) is a 1985 American slasher film directed by Danny Steinmann and starring Melanie Kinnaman, John Shepherd, and Shavar Ross. It is a sequel to Friday the 13th: The Final Chapter (1984) and the fifth installment in the Friday the 13th franchise. Set years after the events of the previous film, the story follows a teenage Tommy Jarvis (Shepherd), who is institutionalized at a halfway house near Crystal Lake because of nightmares of mass murderer Jason Voorhees, whom he killed as a child. Tommy must face his fears when a new hockey mask-wearing murderer initiates another violent killing spree in the area.

A New Beginning features a high number of on-screen murders. Aside from its gore and violence, the film has also become known for its explicit nudity, sex scenes, and numerous depictions of illicit drug use. Peter Bracke's book Crystal Lake Memories: The Complete History of Friday the 13th details that behind the scenes, the production was plagued with hardcore drug use. The film also features a cameo appearance from Corey Feldman, who portrayed Tommy Jarvis in the previous film.

Shot in California in 1984 on a budget of $2.2 million, A New Beginning was released theatrically on March 22, 1985, and grossed $22 million at the U.S. box office. The film was initially going to set up a new trilogy of films with a different villain for the series but, after a disappointing reception from fans and a steep decline in box-office receipts from Friday the 13th Part III (1982) and The Final Chapter, Jason Voorhees was brought back for the next installment Friday the 13th Part VI: Jason Lives (1986) and has been the main antagonist in the series since. In addition to weak box office returns, the film received mostly negative reviews from critics.

Plot
Several years after the death of Jason Voorhees, a teenage Tommy Jarvis is tormented by nightmares of the mass murderer, resulting in his internment in numerous psychiatric hospitals. He is eventually transferred to the Pinehurst Halfway House, managed by Dr. Matt Letter and his assistant Pam Roberts. There, Tommy meets a circle of other teens, including lovers Eddie Kelso and Tina McCarthy, the stutterer Jake Patterson, the goth Violet Moraine, the serious Robin Brown, the compulsive eater Joey Burns, and the young Reggie Winter, whose grandfather George Winter works as the facility's cook. The group is disliked by their neighbor Ethel Hubbard as Eddie and Tina have made a habit of engaging in sexual intercourse on her property. For this reason, Matt forbids the group from venturing outside the facility's premises.

Vic Faden, another patient in the institute, is gripped by a fit of madness caused by Joey's constant pestering and brutally kills him with an axe, leading to his arrest. That evening, two greasers Vinnie and Pete are murdered by an unseen assailant after their car breaks down, and a diner waitress and her boyfriend are killed the following night. The sheriff hypothesizes that Jason Voorhees has come back to life and is the perpetrator of these murders, while Tommy himself is rendered a suspicious party.

The next morning, Eddie and Tina disobediently go into the forest and have sex. They are spotted by Ethel's farmhand Raymond Joffroy who is killed soon after. After returning from washing off in the creek, Eddie finds that Tina has been murdered, and he soon meets the same fate. Meanwhile, Reggie begs his grandfather for a visit to his brother Demon, who has just returned to town, and Pam offers to accompany him while bringing Tommy along. As Pam and Reggie enjoy some enchiladas with Demon and his girlfriend Anita, Tommy meets Ethel's son Junior and gets into a fight with him, but then runs away into the forest after realizing his actions. After Pam and Reggie leave to find Tommy, Demon has a severe case of diarrhea from the enchiladas and runs to the outhouse. While using the outhouse, he and Anita are slaughtered. Upon Pam and Reggie's return to the institute, they are warned of the disappearance of Matt and Reggie's grandfather. Pam goes to search for them, entrusting Reggie to Violet, Jake, and Robin. At this time, Ethel and Junior are killed, as are Jake, Robin, and Violet after Reggie falls asleep. Reggie awakens just as Pam returns, and they discover the trio's corpses in Tommy's room. Moments later, the killer, seemingly a resurrected Jason Voorhees, bursts into the house.

After a long chase in which Pam and Reggie find the corpses of Matt and Reggie's grandfather, Jason is struck by a tractor and then lured into a barn. Tommy returns and is attacked by Jason, but defends himself. Eventually, Tommy throws Jason from the loft window onto a tractor harrow, killing him instantly. In the process the killer's hockey mask comes off, revealing that he is Roy Burns, one of the paramedics who arrived at the scene of Joey's murder. The police later identify Roy as Joey's father and determine that he went insane after his son's death and sought revenge inspired by the stories of Jason's killing sprees. While recovering in the hospital, Tommy has another hallucination of Jason, but he faces his fears and makes him disappear. He then hears Pam approaching and smashes the window to appear as though he has escaped. When Pam rushes in, Tommy appears from behind the door wearing Roy's hockey mask and wielding a kitchen knife.

Cast 

John Hock appeared as Jason Voorhees in the opening dream sequence because Morga was unavailable when the scene was shot. He also performed the stunt where Roy fell off the barn.

Production

Casting

Friday the 13th: A New Beginning was cast under a fake title, Repetition, and many of the actors in the film were not aware it was a Friday the 13th installment until after they were cast in their roles. Among the unaware cast was lead actor John Shepherd, who spent several months volunteering at a state mental hospital to prepare for the role, and that he felt "really disappointed" to discover that Repetition was actually the fifth entry in the Friday the 13th series. Actor Dick Wieand stated, "It wasn't until I saw Part V that I realized what a piece of trash it was. I mean, I knew the series' reputation, but you're always hoping that yours is going to come out better", and director Danny Steinmann stated that he "shot a fucking porno in the woods there. You wouldn't believe the nudity they cut out."

Corey Feldman was only able to make a cameo appearance in the film as a result of his involvement as an actor in The Goonies, which was released the same year as A New Beginning. Feldman filmed the inserts of his cameo on a Sunday, as that was his off day of shooting his other film, and the footage was shot in the backyard of his family's home in Los Angeles with a rain machine.

The film is the only entry in the Friday the 13th film series to feature a hockey mask design with two blue triangles pointing downward, as opposed to the more common variant of three red triangles, with the lower two pointing upward.

Music

On January 13, 2012, La-La Land Records released a limited edition 6-CD boxset containing Harry Manfredini's scores from the first six Friday the 13th films. It sold out in less than 24 hours.

Release

Home media
Friday the 13th: A New Beginning was released on LaserDisc, Betamax, VHS, and CED in 1986, and reissued on VHS in 1994 by Paramount Home Video. Paramount released it in the United States on DVD on September 25, 2001. In 2009, Paramount reissued its Friday the 13th films on DVD in "Deluxe Editions", reissuing A New Beginning on June 16, 2009. This release featured several newly commissioned bonus materials, including an audio commentary and interviews with the cast and crew.

Paramount and Warner Brothers co-released the Friday the 13th: The Complete Collection Blu-ray box set on September 13, 2013, featuring each of the twelve films; this marked the first Blu-ray release of A New Beginning. Paramount and Warner reissued the film as a standalone double-feature Blu-ray paired with Friday the 13th Part VI: Jason Lives in 2014. Paramount re-released the film in another box set titled, Friday the 13th: The Ultimate Collection in February 2018; the box set features only the first eight films of the franchise.

Reception

Box office
Friday the 13th: A New Beginning opened on March 22, 1985, on 1,759 screens. The film debuted at number 1 on its opening weekend with a gross of $8,032,883, beating the teen sex comedy sequel Porky's Revenge, the  biopic Mask, Berry Gordy's martial-arts action musical The Last Dragon and the Disney dinosaur fantasy Baby: Secret of the Lost Legend. By the end of its theatrical run, the film earned $22 million at the US box office, placing it at number 41 on the list of 1985's top box office earners. The film faced competition throughout the first half of the year against horror releases Cat's Eye and Lifeforce.

Critical response
On the review aggregator website Rotten Tomatoes, Friday the 13th: A New Beginning holds an approval rating of 18% based on 22 reviews and an average rating of 3.7/10. On Metacritic, it has a weighted average score of 16 out of 100 based on eight critics, indicating "overwhelming dislike."

Gene Siskel of the Chicago Tribune criticized the film for a perceived lack of originality and said there "is little suspense". Variety wrote that it has "even less variation than its predecessors". Vincent Canby of The New York Times wrote, "It's worth recognizing only as an artifact of our culture." A review in the British film journal Films and Filming was critical of its redundancy in comparison to the previous sequels. Henry Edgar of the Daily Press wrote: "If you like the others in this series, you'll like this one. If you didn't, stay away. Jason has his own followers, and he seems willing to continue the bloodshed forever." Steve Davis of The Austin Chronicle criticized the film's repetitive scenes mimicking previous films. Scott Meslow of GQ called the film "the bloodiest, most deranged" installment in the series, noting its total of 22 murder sequences. Leonard Maltin awarded the film no stars and called it "as gruesome and disgusting as ever". Writing for Slant Magazine, Jeremiah Kipp wrote that the film has "more plot than usual", but "the tone is crude, raunchy, and leering".

Notes

References

External links

 
 
 

1980s mystery films
1980s serial killer films
Friday Part 5
1985 films
1985 horror films
American mystery films
American sequel films
American serial killer films
American slasher films
1980s English-language films
Films directed by Danny Steinmann
Films scored by Harry Manfredini
Films set in 1989
Films shot in California
5
Paramount Pictures films
Films about orphans
1980s American films